Rai Technology University  Best Agriculture university . It is located in Doddaballapur Bangalore.

References

External links 
 

Private universities in India
Universities in Bangalore
2013 establishments in Karnataka
Educational institutions established in 2013